Wang Linuo (born 28 August 1979) is a Chinese retired ice hockey player. She was a member of the Chinese women's national ice hockey team and represented China in the women's ice hockey tournaments at the 2002 and 2010 Winter Olympics, serving as team captain in 2010.

References

External links 
 
 
 
 
 
 

1979 births
Living people
Chinese women's ice hockey players
Sportspeople from Harbin
Calgary Oval X-Treme players
Ice hockey players at the 2002 Winter Olympics
Ice hockey players at the 2010 Winter Olympics
Olympic ice hockey players of China
Asian Games gold medalists for China
Asian Games bronze medalists for China
Medalists at the 1999 Asian Winter Games
Medalists at the 2003 Asian Winter Games
Medalists at the 2007 Asian Winter Games
Ice hockey players at the 1999 Asian Winter Games
Ice hockey players at the 2003 Asian Winter Games
Ice hockey players at the 2007 Asian Winter Games
Asian Games medalists in ice hockey